Mary Horne Odom (January 29, 1921 – November 22, 2014) was an American educator and politician.

Early life and education
Born in Greenville, North Carolina, Odom graduated from Greenville High School and then received her bachelor's degree from what is now East Carolina University. Odom also went to University of North Carolina at Chapel Hill.

Career
Odom was a high school teacher. Odom also worked for the United States Post Office and was a reporter for the Laurinburg Exchange. She lived in Wagram, North Carolina. Odom served in the North Carolina House of Representatives in 1971 and 1972 as a Democrat and then in the North Carolina State Senate in 1975 and 1976.

Death
Odom died at the age of 93 in Raleigh, North Carolina.

Notes

1921 births
2014 deaths
People from Greenville, North Carolina
People from Scotland County, North Carolina
East Carolina University alumni
University of North Carolina at Chapel Hill alumni
Educators from North Carolina
American women educators
Journalists from North Carolina
Women state legislators in North Carolina
Democratic Party members of the North Carolina House of Representatives
Democratic Party North Carolina state senators
21st-century American women